June Marie Salter AM (22 June 193215 September 2001) was an Australian actress and author prominent in theatre and television, best known for her character roles.

Biography
June Salter was born in Bexley, New South Wales, the youngest of six children of Arthur Edward Salter (born c. 1887) and his wife Edna Edythe Salter (died 24 July 1969), who married in 1916 and had a home on Henderson Road, Bexley.

As a child, she studied piano and elocution and attended Kogarah Central Domestic Science Secondary School. She obtained her New South Wales Intermediate Certificate in 1947.
While working as a typist-receptionist, she joined the St George Players who played at St James' Hall (later called "Mercury Theatre" then "Phillip Street Theatre") and took further elocution lessons from Rosalind Kennerdale who was married to Lawrence H. Cecil. Largely through their influence, in 1952 she gained acting roles in 2GB's serial Night Beat, continuing her office work part-time until that was no longer possible. With the help of Queenie Ashton, she was accepted onto the books of Central Casting (Ashton's husband John Cover's company). Other jobs followed: Martin's Corner on 2UW, Undercover Carson and Shadows of Doubt on 2GB and Blue Hills for the ABC as Sally Edwards, taking over from original actress Barbara Brunton.

Stage work
After years of amateur productions, such as St George United Artists' Rookery Nook at St James' Hall in 1953, she was invited to take part in Bill Orr's Hit and Run (the first Phillip Street Revue), then Hat Trick with Charles Tingwell, Gordon Chater, Bettina Welch, John Ewart, Lyle O'Hara and Ray Barrett. This was followed by a prominent role in Hot from Hollywood starring Mel Tormé and Irene Ryan, then Laugh Around the Clock with Billy Russell and Gordon Chater at Tivoli Theatres in Sydney and Melbourne. Her next "Phillip Street Revue" was the long-running Cross Section co-starring first with Ruth Cracknell then John Meillon. It was during this time that in May 1958 John proposed; they were married two months later. They had only been married a few months when John was offered a series of film roles in London. Apart from a few quick trips home they were to remain there together until 1963. But while John was much in demand, there was no call for her talents in London, so when offered a work in the developing television industry she jumped at the chance. She did little stage work until Rattle of a Simple Man for Bill Orr at the Phillip Theatre, co-starring with John who had just returned from London. She starred in There Will Be a Interval of 15 Minutes, again for Bill Orr.

Comedy stints at Frank Strain's "Bull 'n' Bush" theatre-restaurant followed.

Her next major roles were in Crown Matrimonial for Peter Williams as Queen Mary; first at the York Theatre in the Seymour Centre then at the Mayfair Theatre. This was followed by Night Mother with Jill Perryman for Edgar Metcalfe at the Perth Playhouse then nationally.

A string of comedies for Peter Williams followed: Blithe Spirit as "Madame Arcati" for Peter Williams, followed by Relatively Speaking as "Sheila", Bedroom Farce as "Delia", then Mother's Day as "Sophie Greengrass" at the Ensemble Theatre for Edgar Metcalfe and Lettice and Lovage with Ruth Cracknell for Richard Cottrell and the Sydney Theatre Company, opening in 1989 at the Sydney Opera House.

Then came three plays followed at the Marian Street theatre: Love Letters, Rebecca as "Mrs Danvers" and On Golden Pond as "Ethel Thayer". She played Lettice and Lovage again, this time with Judi Farr and directed by Peter Willams.

A one-woman show Legends at the Tilbury Hotel in Woolloomooloo in 1993 received rapturous critique in the Sydney Morning Herald then toured New South Wales.

That was followed by a First Night of the Proms at the Sydney Opera House to celebrate its twentieth anniversary.

Television
June Salter was one of the earliest performers on Australian television, singing "I'm getting nothing for Christmas" from the current Phillip Street Revue at the ATN7 studios in December 1956. Her next (having just returned from London) was a singing spot on Channel 7's Studio A with the Tommy Tycho orchestra, followed appearances in the Mavis Bramston Show comedy series with Gordon Chater, Carol Raye, and Barry Creyton, initially as a guest then co-star.

Her next significant role was in the long-running ABC series Certain Women as solicitor "Freda Lucas" co-starring with Queenie Ashton, Joan Bruce, Jenny Lee, Judy Morris and Elizabeth Crosby.

She remains best known for her role as schoolteacher Elizabeth McKenzie in the soap opera The Restless Years and for her regular guest appearances in A Country Practice as Matron Hilda Arrowsmith.

She played Jim Robinson's mother Bess, in the first series of Neighbours.

She also had guest appearances (mostly for Crawford Productions) on: Cop Shop, Division 4, Matlock Police, Number 96, G.P., Murder Call, All Saints, Holiday Island, The Sullivans, The Adventures of Skippy and Farscape.

She played in the 1982 telemovie Wilde's Domain.

Salter also featured in the film Caddie.

Personal
She married John Meillon in 1958, with whom she had a son, John Meillon, Jr. There were years of separation occasioned by the demands of their separate careers, there had been John's problems with alcohol, but their relationship ended when he found a new love. They divorced in 1971. She and John Jr. then lived for some time with longtime acquaintance Gwen Friend, sister of the painter Donald Friend. She never remarried and was distraught when John Meillon died in 1989.

Death
She was a heavy smoker and died of cancer of the oesophagus aged 69 in 2001.

Filmography

Film

Television

Recognition
Penguin Award 1975, 1976 for her role in Certain Women.
Sammy award for her part in the short-lived Hotel Story TV series
The Queen's Silver Jubilee Medal 1977
Golden Sammy award for Certain Women
Appearance on Channel 7's This Is Your Life
Glugs award for Crown Matrimonial 1978
Member of the Order of Australia (AM), Australia Day Honours 1982, "for service to the performing arts"
Salter was the subject of the second episode of Face Painting with Bill Leak, which aired on ABC TV on 24 November 2008.

References

Sources
Salter, June A Pinch of Salt Angus & Robertson 1995

External links
 

1932 births
2001 deaths
Australian television actresses
Australian stage actresses
Members of the Order of Australia
Actresses from Sydney
20th-century Australian actresses
21st-century Australian women
21st-century Australian people